"Takin' Back My Love" is a song by Spanish singer and songwriter Enrique Iglesias featuring American singer Ciara. It is the second single from his English greatest hits album Greatest Hits. The song was produced by RedOne who was a co-writer of the song alongside Iglesias and Frankie Storm.

The original version of the song features R&B singer Ciara and was released internationally. A second version which features pop singer Sarah Connor in place of Ciara was released in Germany, the Netherlands, Switzerland, Austria, Poland and other parts of central Europe. In France, the song was re-recorded with the French R&B singer Tyssem singing her portion of the song in French and re-titled "Takin' Back My Love (Sans l'ombre d'un remord)".

Release and promotion
Iglesias first performed the song in on the French TV show Star Academy as a duet with one of the contestants, Gaultier. The performance was enthusiastically received by the show's audience and the judges who gave the pair a standing ovation. This performance propelled the Ciara version of the song debut at #3 in France.

Iglesias and Ciara both performed the single for the first time at the 2009 Pro Bowl Half-time Show in Hawaii.

Due to studio commitments Ciara had to pull out of promotion for the single and Australian singer Gabriella Cilmi was asked to lend her vocals to most of the European promo. So far they have performed the song on the Dutch TV show Life & Cooking, The Paul O'Grady Show, Loose Women and The Alan Titchmarsh Show in the United Kingdom as well as the Meteor Music Awards in Ireland.

Iglesias has performed the song with Sarah Connor on the German show "Nur die Liebe zählt".

Ciara performed the single alone in London, as a part of her set during the European leg of Britney Spears' worldwide tour The Circus Starring Britney Spears.

Iglesias and Ciara both performed the single for the second time together in London, at the 2009 Capital FM Summertime Ball.

Critical reception
Digital Spy said that "Takin' Back My Love" finds Iglesias acting out a break-up with 'Goodies' singer Ciara. 'Go ahead just leave, can't hold you, you're free', he wails with typical passion. Not too keen on her impending single status, Ciara replies: 'What did I do but give love to you? I'm just confused as I stand here and look at you.' With its Europoppy beat and suitably dramatic chorus, this manages to pack an emotional punch while also remaining appealingly cheesy".

Billboard gave the song a positive review: "Thanks to a global fan base, Enrique Iglesias' dance duet "Takin' Back My Love" is already a hit on the European Hot 100 and a top 10 in Germany and France. RedOne, best known for his framework on Kat DeLuna's 'Whine Up' and Lady GaGa's two recent No. 1s, lends his party song production talents. Pop star Sarah Connor recorded a version with Iglesias, which has been popular in Europe, but Ciara is better paired with the Latin pop star, with their soft and sensual vocal styles. The synth sounds pinball off one another as Iglesias belts through the choruses and Ciara's panting rounds out the single, which is also riding the Hot Dance Club Play chart".

Music video
The video was shot in Los Angeles on 13 January 2009 and directed by the Norwegian director Ray Kay, who helmed Christina Milian's "Us Against the World" clip, amongst many other videos for R&B music artists. The video was released in February 2009.

The entire music video is shot under blue-screen to give off a radiant but monotone color set. The music video opens up viewing portraits of Iglesias and Ciara, then an ironic switch showing the two arguing and pushing back and forth outside of the house. The two part ways, and the song begins with Iglesias's first verse. He sings as the video randomly shoots back to a scene where Ciara is up against a wall. The chorus enters as Iglesias is shown throwing things off a counter and out of drawers.

The next verse enters Ciara walking in the room apparently angry at Iglesias. As she sings her verse, she proceeds to pick up a jacket that reads "From C, with Love" and heads to the pool and throws the jacket in the water. What ensues shortly after is a back and forth argument involving the two destroying the house, from Iglesias throwing dishes and glasses out of the refrigerator, to Ciara burning songbooks and pouring paint on top of his car. Then, the 
two briefly meet in the dining room of the house, where they obviously still have feelings for one another. They then kiss and perform sexual dance-like moves against each other. Then, as Ciara comes back to reality and snatches his hand from her, the two immediately go right back to arguing and destroying what is left of the house. As the video closes, the two are seen in a destroyed dining room with lights flickering on and off, approaching each other once again. Iglesias then grabs Ciara, and the video ends with the two kissing and smiling.

A music video for the version featuring Sarah Connor was released in March 2009, it is intercut with scenes from the music video that was made for the version featuring Ciara.

The Connor version shows the same story (including Ciara) but instead of the scenes where Ciara sings in front of a wall, Connor is shown singing and dancing in a room that seems to be in the same house that Iglesias and Ciara are destroying. The video also randomly shoots to a scene where Iglesias confesses his actions to Connor, implying that Connor sings the emotions and thoughts of Ciara. Pictures of Ciara can be seen in the video with Connor.

The Ciara version music video has been viewed over 236 million times on YouTube.

Formats and track listings
UK digital single (Released: 23 March 2009)
"Takin' Back My Love" (feat. Ciara) - 3:51
"Takin' Back My Love" (feat. Ciara) (Moto Blanco Radio Mix) - 3:51
"Takin' Back My Love" (Video) - 3:57

France CD single (Released: 9 March 2009)
"Takin' Back My Love" (feat. Tyssem) (Sans L'Ombre D'Un Remord) - 3:51
"Takin' Back My Love" (feat. Ciara) (Main Version) - 3:51
"Takin' Back My Love" (feat. Ciara) (Junior Caldera Club Remix) - 5:20
"Takin' Back My Love" (feat. Ciara) (Glam As You Club Mix) - 7:59

German CD single (Released: 23 March 2009)
"Takin' Back My Love" (feat. Sarah Connor) (Radio Mix) – 3:50
"Takin' Back My Love" (feat. Sarah Connor) (Alternate Mix) – 3:50
"Takin' Back My Love" (feat. Sarah Connor) (Video) - 3:57

Chart performance
"Takin' Back My Love" became an international hit debuting at #3 on French Singles Chart on 17 January 2009, with 3,137 copies sold, being ex aequo with the number two. The single debuted at #14 on the Eurochart Hot 100 chart after its first week of release where it peaked for two weeks and then jumped 10 spots to #4.

In the United Kingdom, the song debuted at #88. It peaked at #12. In Ireland, the song managed a peak of #7. The single went gold in Russia with 100,000 copies sold.

Weekly charts

Year-end charts

Certifications and sales

See also
 List of Romanian Top 100 number ones of the 2000s

References

2009 singles
Ciara songs
Sarah Connor (singer) songs
Enrique Iglesias songs
Song recordings produced by RedOne
Male–female vocal duets
Music videos directed by Ray Kay
Number-one singles in Romania
Songs written by Enrique Iglesias
Songs written by RedOne
2008 songs
Electropop ballads
Interscope Records singles
2000s ballads